The Orée-du-Parc District (District 9) is a municipal district in the city of Gatineau, Quebec. It is currently served on Gatineau City Council by Isabelle N. Miron of Action Gatineau.

The district is located in the Hull sector of the city. The district includes the northern part of Hull, including the neighbourhoods of Mont-Blue, Ironside and part of Parc de la Montagne. The name of the district translates to "the edge of the park", referring to Gatineau Park which it is adjacent.

Councillors
Louise Poirier (2001–2006)
Claude Millette (2006–2009)
Mireille Apollon, (2009-2017), Action Gatineau (from 2013)
Isabelle N. Miron, Action Gatineau (2017–present)

Election results

2001

2005

2008 by-election
An election was held on October 26 to fill the seat vacated by Ms. Poirier.

2009

2013

2017

2021

References

Districts of Gatineau